Nikolaj Andreas Hansen (born 15 March 1993) is a Danish professional footballer who plays as a striker for Icelandic club Víkingur.

Honours
Víkingur Reykjavík
Icelandic Cup: 2019, 2021, 2022.
Icelandic Premier League: 2021

Individual
Icelandic Premier League - Top scorer: 2021
Icelandic Premier League - Best Player: 2021

References

External links
 
 Eliteprospects Profile
 BT-Holdet Profile

1993 births
Living people
Danish men's footballers
Danish expatriate men's footballers
FC Vestsjælland players
HB Køge players
Valur (men's football) players
Knattspyrnufélagið Víkingur players
Danish Superliga players
Danish 1st Division players
Úrvalsdeild karla (football) players
Expatriate footballers in Iceland
Danish expatriate sportspeople in Iceland
Association football forwards
People from Ringsted
Sportspeople from Region Zealand